Johnson, Drake & Piper was a construction contracting firm.

Overview
During World War II, the firm did construction work in the Middle East, including building needless housing intended for the port of Massawa in what is now Eritrea. The housing project in Ghinda was derided by American master diver Edward Ellsberg who was clearing the port of sunken ships. Ellsberg judged that the housing was too far from the port for practical use by salvage crews.

A number of the firm's works at Fort Peck, Montana, in support of the 1930s construction of the Fort Peck Dam, are listed on the National Register of Historic Places.

The firm's percentage-of-completion method for accounting for ongoing projects were challenged in a Federal appeals court case: Johnson, Drake & Piper, Inc., Appellant, v. United States of America, Appellee. Jobs completed by the firm discussed in the case include work in the country of Honduras, highway construction work in the U.S., and other types of work. The firm ceased construction contract work in 1966.

Works
Works by the firm include:
Employee's Hotel and Garage, S. Missouri Ave., Fort Peck, MT (Johnson, Drake & Piper), NRHP-listed
Fort Peck Original Houses Historic District, 1101-1112 E. Kansas Ave., Fort Peck, MT (Johnson, Drake & Piper), NRHP-listed
Garage and Fire Station, Gasconade St., Fort Peck, MT (Johnson, Drake & Piper), NRHP-listed
Hospital (Fort Peck, Montana), S. Platte St., Fort Peck, MT (Johnson, Drake & Piper), NRHP-listed
School (Fort Peck, Montana), N. Missouri Ave., Fort Peck, MT (Johnson, Drake & Piper), NRHP-listed

References

Construction and civil engineering companies of the United States